Jupiter Yves Ngangue (in other sources - Yves Jupiter Ngangue; born 14 May 1980 in Yaoundé) is a former Cameroonian football player.

His short stay in Dagestan in 2001 was problematic, given that Ngangue was one of the very few non-Dagestanis in the insecure region at that time. He had to stay at the guest house of the government all the time.

References

1980 births
Living people
Cameroonian footballers
Canon Yaoundé players
FC Anzhi Makhachkala players
Russian Premier League players
Cameroonian expatriate footballers
Expatriate footballers in Russia
Expatriate footballers in France
Expatriate footballers in Tunisia
ES Beni-Khalled players
CS Hammam-Lif players
Ayeyawady United F.C. players
Expatriate footballers in Myanmar
Association football forwards